Cinta yang tak Sederhana (English: Love That's Isn't Simple) is an Indonesian soap opera is an Indonesian television series produced by SinemArt, which premiered on March 20, 2023 (Coming Soon), on Indosiar. This soap operas is directed by ? and starting Gede Erdin Werdrayana and Dannia Salsabilla

Synopsis 

Raja is a handsome man and the grandson of a successful businessman. Raja loves Indah, a beautiful and charming girl who is simple. But because of his grandfather's request Raja is forced to marry Nasya, the daughter of a business partner. On the other hand, there is Adi who loves Nasya but can only keep his love feelings to himself. What will happen between Indah, Raja, Nasya and Adi? Can Indah finally unite with Raja?

Casts

References 

2023 Indonesian television series debuts
2020s Indonesian television series
2020s Indonesian television series debuts
Indonesian drama television series
Indosiar original programming